Gary R Smith (born 1962) is an English international indoor bowler. He is not to be confused with the former international bowler Gary Smith.

Career
He has been a bowler since 1998, and won the National Indoor title in 2008.

He played for the Stanley Indoor club before moving to play for Sunderland and then on to Durham.

References

Living people
English male bowls players
1962 births